Slipback is a radio audio drama based on the long-running British science fiction television series Doctor Who, produced by the BBC and first broadcast in six episodes on BBC Radio 4 from 25 July to 8 August 1985, as part of a children's magazine show called Pirate Radio Four. It was later released on cassette and CD, most recently by BBC Audio and free with the 27 April 2010 edition of The Daily Telegraph newspaper via WHSmith.

Synopsis
The Sixth Doctor and Peri arrive on a mysterious space liner, where intergalactic policemen are investigating art thefts, a computer is suffering from a split personality and the Captain's disease threatens every living thing on the ship…

Production
Slipback was broadcast on BBC Radio 4, four months after the final episode of Doctor Who'''s twenty-second season, during the programme's enforced hiatus, the next season not airing for another a year and a half.  It was the first Doctor Who serial produced as a radio play (an earlier audio production, The Pescatons, was released as a story record). No further radio productions were mounted until the mid-1990s when Jon Pertwee reprised his role as the Third Doctor in two productions, The Paradise of Death and The Ghosts of N-Space.

Writing
The story was written by series script writer Eric Saward, whose writing credits include The Visitation, Earthshock, Resurrection of the Daleks and Revelation of the Daleks.  

Cast note
Valentine Dyall played the Black Guardian in the television series. Dyall died on 24 June 1985, just 14 days after Slipback was recorded, and a month before Slipback aired.

In print

A novelisation by Eric Saward was published by Target Books in April 1986, the first novelisation of a non-televised Doctor Who story. Saward's novelisation expands on the radio play greatly, with an extensive prologue running about a third of the book before the Doctor appears and the adaptation of the radio play storyline begins.

Audio releasesSlipback was released on 7 November 1988 on a double audio cassette along with the 1978 LP version of Genesis of the Daleks''. It was subsequently released as a standalone CD on 8 January 2001.

References

External links

Target novelisation
 On Target — Slipback
The Cloister Library - Slipback

Sixth Doctor audio plays
Radio plays based on Doctor Who
1985 audio plays
1985 radio dramas